Bemidji Airlines (Bemidji Aviation Services Inc) is an American airline based in Bemidji, Minnesota, USA. It operates domestic cargo flights, as well as extensive charter and air taxi services. Its main base is Bemidji Regional Airport, with hubs/bases at Minneapolis-Saint Paul International Airport, Denver International Airport, Sioux Falls Regional Airport, and Fargo.

History

The airline was established in 1946 and started operations in 1947 operating a single Noorduyn Norseman aircraft. From 1981 to 1991, the airline operated with scheduled service from Bemidji; Thief River Falls, Minnesota; Worthington, Minnesota; and Mankato, Minnesota, all to the Minneapolis–Saint Paul International Airport. In the mid-eighties, they expanded the business to include many regional cargo freight runs, and added many larger aircraft. Since 1991, primary activities have been small-feeder cargo services, passenger and cargo charters, and typical fixed-base operations at the Bemidji Airport. In January 2017, Sioux Falls, South Dakota, based Business Aviation Courier (DBA Encore Air Cargo) was acquired from BBA Aviation. With the 2017 acquisition, the company now has 120 employees. The company became a 100% ESOP (Employee Stock Ownership Plan) in 2007.

Destinations

Bemidji Airlines operates domestic cargo/passenger services within Minnesota, Wisconsin, Colorado, Kansas, Nebraska, North Dakota, and South Dakota as well as extensive charter and air taxi work within the USA and Canada.

Fleet 

The Bemidji Airlines fleet consists of the following aircraft (at Mar 2020):

11 Beechcraft 99, 99A or C99
15 Fairchild Metro III Model AC227-AC
22 Beechcraft Queenair with Excalibur Modification
1 Beechcraft King Air E90
1 Beechcraft 58 Baron
2 Cessna 404 Titan
4 Cessna 402B
2 Cessna 172

References

External links
Bemidji Aviation
Encore Air Cargo

Airlines based in Minnesota
Companies based in Minnesota
Transportation in Minnesota
Airlines established in 1946
Regional airlines of the United States
1946 establishments in Minnesota
Cargo airlines of the United States